This is a list of universities in Turkey. There are 209 universities and academies in total: 129 state universities (eleven technical universities, one institutes of technology, and two fine arts university, one special national defense university, and one police academy), 76 private foundation universities, four two-year granting institutions.

Listing by location (provinces)

Further education

Former / Closed

International rankings 
According to the THE–QS World University Rankings:

See also
 Hoca Ahmet Yesevi Turkish Kazakh University
 Kyrgyzstan-Turkey Manas University

References

External links
Study in Turkey
Türkiye Scholarships
Council of Higher Education (YOK)

Universities
Turkey
Turkey
Turkey